Brauerei Gebr. Maisel KG (Maisel Bros. Brewery) is a family-owned brewery located in Bayreuth, Germany, best known for their wheat beer.

History
It was founded in 1887 by the brothers Eberhardt and Hans Maisel in the Upper Franconian city of Bayreuth. 

In 1955, the brewery introduced Maisel's Weisse, a line of wheat beers for which they are best known.

In 2001, the Maisel family sold a 35% stake to Veltins, which was purchased back in December 2005, although the two breweries still cooperate on distribution.

References

1887 establishments in Germany
Breweries in Germany
Beer brands of Germany
Pages translated from German Wikipedia